Mandiganal is a village in Dharwad district of Karnataka, India.

Demographics 
As of the 2011 Census of India there were 188 households in Mandiganal and a total population of 871 consisting of 436 males and 435 females. There were 84 children ages 0-6.

References

Villages in Dharwad district